N. U. Unruh (born Andrew Chudy on June 9, 1957, in New York City, U.S.) is a German musician, experimental percussionist, and instruments inventor, probably best known for his work with German music group Einstürzende Neubauten.

Biography
In 1980, Unruh was a co-founder of the German band Einstürzende Neubauten, together with his school friend Blixa Bargeld. Both are still band members. Unruh usually plays self-constructed percussion instruments.

In 2000, Unruh released a solo album, Euphorie im Zeitalter der digitalen Informationsübertragung ("Euphoria in the era of digital data transfer").

He is also a member of the band Bombus (not be confused with the Swedish band of the same name), which describes itself as "electronic dance music combined with drummers, performers, and DJs".

In 2004 Unruh released a DVD, "12 Ambiences Airshow".

Eponymy: Unruhdinium, a dinophyte taxon

Discography
Einstürzende Neubauten
See Einstürzende Neubauten discography

Solo discography
 2000 Euphorie im Zeitalter der digitalen Informationsübertragung
 2004 12 Ambiences Airshow

References

External links
Einstürzende Neubauten - official website

Bombus - official website

1957 births
Living people
German rock drummers
Male drummers
German male musicians
Einstürzende Neubauten members